René Écuyer (born 4 September 1956) is a French former freestyle swimmer. He competed at the 1976 Summer Olympics and the 1980 Summer Olympics.

References

External links
 

1956 births
Living people
French male freestyle swimmers
Olympic swimmers of France
Swimmers at the 1976 Summer Olympics
Swimmers at the 1980 Summer Olympics
Place of birth missing (living people)
Swimmers at the 1979 Mediterranean Games
20th-century French people
21st-century French people